Eric Wayne Burlison (born October 2, 1976) is an American politician serving as the U.S. representative from Missouri's 7th congressional district since 2023. He previously served as the representative for District 133 (Greene County) in the Missouri House of Representatives. A Republican, Burlison was elected to the Missouri House in 2008 and left office at the end of 2016. In 2018, he was elected to the Missouri Senate, representing District 20. He was elected to Congress in 2022.

Early life and education
A 1995 graduate of Parkview High School in Springfield, Missouri, Burlison received a Bachelor of Arts degree in philosophy in 2000 and a Master of Business Administration in 2002 from Southwest Missouri State University.

Early career 
Burlison was employed at CoxHealth as a software engineer before being promoted to business analyst. He now works for Cerner.

Burlison is a member of the Freedom of Road Riders, Missouri Right to Life, National Rifle Association, and the Missouri Chamber of Commerce.

Missouri House of Representatives 
Burlison served in the Missouri House from 2009 to 2016. During that time, he chaired the House Committee on Professional Registration and Licensing and was vice chair of the House Special Committee on Health Insurance.

In 2011, Burlison sponsored a bill that made Missouri join the Health Care Compact. The compact became law in Missouri and seven other states.

In 2014, Burlison passed a bill to provide children with dyslexia better access to educational services. The legislation added dyslexia to a state grant program to help the families of children with disabilities pay for special education programs.

In 2016, Burlison sponsored and passed a bill to eliminate conceal and carry requirements in Missouri.

Missouri Senate 
In 2018, Burlison was elected to the Missouri Senate, representing the 20th District, which comprises Christian County and part of Greene County. Burlison's committee assignments included:

 Commerce, Consumer Protection, Energy and the Environment
 General Laws
 Insurance and Banking
 Professional Registration (vice chair)
 Small Business and Industry (chair)
 Joint Committee on Government Accountability
 Cyber Crime Investigation Fund Panel
 Missouri Consolidated Health Care Plan Board of Trustees
 State Records Commission

U.S. House of Representatives

Elections

2022 
In 2022, Burlison defeated Democratic nominee Kristen Radaker-Sheafer in the race for Missouri's 7th congressional district with 70.9% of the vote to Radaker-Shefer's 26.9%. His term of office in the 118th U.S. Congress began on January 3, 2023.

Tenure 
In a speech on the House floor at the start of his term, Burlison criticized DirectTV for removing Newsmax TV from its listings. He invoked the Holocaust while condemning DirectTV's actions, quoting the poem "First they came ..." by Martin Niemoller and suggesting that cable companies were censoring conservatives.

Syria 
In 2023, Burilson was among 47 Republicans to vote in favor of H.Con.Res. 21, which directed President Joe Biden to remove U.S. troops from Syria within 180 days.

Caucus memberships 

 Freedom Caucus

Personal life 
Burlison lives outside of Springfield with his wife Angie and two daughters. He attends Destiny Church in Republic, Missouri, and is active in supporting campus ministries such as The Potter's House and Campus Crusade for Christ. Burlison is involved with Big Brothers Big Sisters of the Ozarks and was named the Big Brother of the Year in 2005. He serves on the board of D.R.E.A.M and the Harmony House for battered and abused women.

Electoral history

State Representative

State Senate

U.S House of Representatives

References

External links
 Congressman Eric Burlison official U.S. House website
Eric Burlison for Congress

|-

1976 births
21st-century American politicians
Living people
Missouri State University alumni
Politicians from Springfield, Missouri
Republican Party members of the Missouri House of Representatives
Republican Party members of the United States House of Representatives from Missouri
Republican Party Missouri state senators